An exurb (or alternately: exurban area) is an area outside the typically denser inner suburban area, at the edge of a metropolitan area, which has some economic and commuting connection to the metro area, low housing density, and growth. It shapes an interface between urban and rural landscapes holding a limited urban nature for its functional, economic, and social interaction with the urban center, due to its dominant residential character. Exurbs consist of "agglomerations of housing and jobs outside the municipal boundaries of a primary city" and beyond the surrounding suburbs.

Definitions
The word exurb (a portmanteau of extra (outside) and urban) was coined by Auguste Comte Spectorsky, in his 1955 book The Exurbanites, to describe the ring of prosperous communities beyond the suburbs, that are commuter towns for an urban area. In other uses the term has expanded to include popular extraurban districts which nonetheless may have poor transportation and underdeveloped economies due to distance from the urban center. Exurbs can be defined in terms of population density across the extended urban area, for example "the urban core (old urban areas including Siming and Huli, where the population density is greater than 51 persons per ha), the suburban zone (old urban and new urban transitional zones including Haicang and Jimei, where the population density is greater than 8 persons per ha), and the exurban areas (newly urbanized areas including Tong'an and Xiang'an, where the population density is less than 8 persons per ha)". The mixture of urban and rural environments raises ecological issues.

Examples by country

China
Changping District, Beijing
Shunyi District, Beijing
Shenjia village, Loudi city, Hunan province

Russia
Rublyovka, Moscow

United States

Since the Finding Exurbia report by the Brookings Institution in 2006, the term is generally used for areas beyond suburbs and specifically less densely built and populated than the suburbs to which the exurbs' residents commute. To qualify as exurban, a census tract must meet three criteria:
 Economic connection to a large metropolis. 
 Low housing density: bottom third of census tracts with regard to housing density.
 Population growth exceeding the average for its central metropolitan area.
These are based on published datasets. Alternative approaches include working with Oak Ridge National Laboratory LandScan data and GIS.

Exurban areas incorporate a mix of rural development (e.g., farms and open space) and in places, suburban-style development (e.g., tracts of single-family homes, though usually  on large lots). In long-settled areas, such as the U.S. Northeast megalopolis, exurban areas incorporate pre-existing towns, villages and smaller cities, as well as strips of older single-family homes built along pre-existing roads that connected the older population centers of what was once a rural area.
The Brookings Institution listed exurban counties, defined as having at least 20% of their residents in exurban Census tracts.

See also
Bedroom town
Rural area
Rural-urban commuting area
Rural–urban fringe
Suburb

References

Types of towns
Urban studies and planning terminology
Urbanization
Rural geography
Public transport
1950s neologisms